The Battle of Harar was a battle of the Ogaden War. The battle took place from October 1977 until January 1978, and was fought near Harar, Ethiopia. The Soviet advisers and Cuban soldiers took part supporting the Ethiopian army, during the battle they engaged the attackers in vicious fighting. Though the Somali forces reached the Harar city outskirts by November, they did not take the city and eventually withdrew to await the Ethiopian counterattack.

See also
 Battle of Jijiga

References

 

Harar
Harar
1977 in Ethiopia
1978 in Ethiopia
Conflicts in 1977
Conflicts in 1978
Harar